Authenticity or authentic may refer to:

 Authentication, the act of confirming the truth of an attribute

Arts and entertainment
 Authenticity in art, ways in which a work of art or an artistic performance may be considered authentic

Music
 Authentic performance, an approach to the performance of classical music
 Authentic Records, a record label
 Authentic mode, a set of pitch organizations used in Gregorian chant

Albums
 Authenticity (Foreign Exchange album), by The Foreign Exchange
 Authentic (Joey Pearson album)
 Authentic (LL Cool J album)

Other uses
 Authenticity (philosophy), a particular way of dealing with the external world, being faithful to internal rather than external ideas
 Authentication (law), evidence proven to be genuine
 SS Authenticity, a coastal tanker
 Authenticity Party, an Egyptian political party
 Authentic (show jumping horse), an Olympic show jumper ridden by Beezie Madden
 Authentic (racehorse), winner of the 2020 Kentucky Derby
 Message authentication, in information security

See also
 Authenticité (disambiguation)
 Authentic leadership
 Authentic learning
 Counterfeit
 eAuthentication
 Provenance
 Verisimilitude